The Stichting IKEA Foundation (KvK 41202422) is a Dutch foundation founded in 1982 by Ingvar Kamprad, a Swedish billionaire and founder of IKEA. The foundation is funded by the Stichting INGKA Foundation. Initially focused on architecture and interior design, its scope expanded in 2009 to include "improving children's opportunities". In 2020, total grants disbursed by the foundation amounted to $ million.

Giving 
Unlike its funder the INGKA Foundation, the IKEA Foundation has ANBI (algemeen nut beogende instelling, "Institution for General Benefit") status from the Dutch Tax Service. In 2017, the foundation received 159 million euros from the INGKA Foundation, of which it donated 144 million. Recipients of the donations include MSF, UNHCR, Save the Children, and We Mean Business Coalition for climate change.

In 2019, the IKEA Foundation pledged $7.7 million to a development impact fund assembled by KOIS, an impact finance firm, to support Syrian refugees. According to the OECD, the IKEA Foundation disbursed US$192.5 million for development in 2019 in the form of grants.

In December 2020, the IKEA Foundation invested 30 million dollars in Aceli Africa (loans to agricultural SMEs) along with the Swiss Agency for Development and Cooperation and the USAID.

The IKEA Foundation announced an alliance with the Rockefeller Foundation to raise $10 billion in capital to finance small-scale renewable energy projects in June 2021. Each organization committed $500 million to the fund initially, with a goal to grow the fund to $100 billion, aftering partnering with other organizations. According to Financial Times, the foundations set targets to reduce annual CO2 emissions by one billion tonnes, and eliminate energy poverty for one billion people by the end of 2029. The Bezos Earth Fund subsequently joined the IKEA and Rockefeller foundations, pledging an additional $500 million in funds in November 2021. The Global Energy Alliance for People and Planet was officially launched at the 2021 United Nations Climate Change Conference, with more than $8 billion pledged in additional funding from multilateral banks and development agencies. The alliance's first projects were scheduled to take place in Africa, Asia, and Latin America.

In March 2022, the IKEA Foundation gave $22 million in immediate aid to people displaced by the 2022 Russian invasion of Ukraine. The announcement came shortly after IKEA ceased Russian operations in response to the conflict. The foundation provided $ million in funding to Renewable Energy for Refugees, a project that The Guardian reported had installed 183 streetlights, 4,000 solar home systems and 5,600 stoves across three refugee camps and nearby villages in Rwanda, as of April 2022. In May 2022, the foundation committed $5.8 million to the Sustainable Energy for All's Universal Energy Facility, a results-based financing initiative.

Projects with UNHCR
Between 2012 and 2019, the foundation invested approximately US$100 million in the UNHCR operations in the Dollo Ado refugee camps. According to a study by the University of Oxford Refugee Studies Centre, at the time it was the largest private sector investment made in a specific refugee setting. The funds were grouped into two phases. From 2012 through 2014, a $61.5 million grant was distributed to address infrastructure and emergency aid needs, including investments in education, shelter, nutrition, water, sanitation, and hygiene. From 2015 to 2019, a $37.5 million grant supported refugee livelihoods and establishment of self-reliance. This phase emphasized investments in agriculture, livestock, environment, energy, and microfinance loan initiatives. At the end of 2018, the livelihood program had 2050 members earning income, and had disbursed 525 loans.
 
The foundation has also partnered with UNHCR for its Brighter Lives for Refugees campaign, contributing $10.6 million to provide lighting to refugees in 2014; and the foundation funded Better Shelter to develop a flat packed refugee shelter in collaboration with UNHCR. The shelter consists of a steel frame, stab-proof polypropylene panels, and rooftop solar panels. Better Shelter won the London Design Museum's Design of the Year award in 2016. Between 2015 and 2017, shelters were sent to locations such as Iraq and Djibouti. They were also used as clinics following the April 2015 Nepal earthquake. The shelter project had some challenges; 62 shelters ordered by Zurich, Switzerland were not used due to fire concerns. A spokesperson for Better Shelters noted that they were not intended to meet Swiss fire regulations, or be used indoors as the city planned. In April 2017, Better Shelter said the product would be redesigned with improvements to lighting and ventilation, and sturdier frames and walls.

In 2023, the foundation donated €10 million to Doctors Without Borders for its work in Syria in response to the 2023 Turkey–Syria earthquake.

Criticisms and reforms 

In May 2006, The Economist magazine estimated that the parent organization's foundation's endowment was worth US$36 billion, making it the world's wealthiest charity at the time; however, it also stated that the foundation "is at the moment also one of its least generous. The overall set-up of IKEA minimises tax and disclosure, handsomely rewards the founding Kamprad family and makes IKEA immune to a takeover". Following the publication of the Economist article, Ingvar Kamprad went to court in the Netherlands to expand the donor intent of the foundation, whereby more money would be spent on children in the developing world. Prior to this, the foundation's articles of association limited the foundation's purpose to "innovation in the field of architectural and interior design" and it had given a relatively small amount of its assets to the Lund Institute of Technology.

See also 
 List of wealthiest foundations
 Financial endowment
 Private foundation
 Foundation (nonprofit)

References 

Foundations based in the Netherlands
IKEA
1982 establishments in the Netherlands